"Dear Angie" is a song composed and sung by bassist Ron Griffiths of The Iveys for the album Maybe Tomorrow.  It was released as the group's second single in some European markets, and it was also included on the Badfinger album Magic Christian Music.

History
Although The Iveys' first single on Apple Records, "Maybe Tomorrow", had flopped in the UK, it surprisingly reached number 1 in the Netherlands.  As a result, Apple wanted to release a second Iveys single to give the group another chance for success.  Producer Tony Visconti selected "Dear Angie", and it was scheduled for worldwide release as Apple 14, simultaneously with the Maybe Tomorrow album.

However, before the single and album were released, Allan Klein took over as head of Apple Corps.  Klein promptly blocked release of both of The Iveys' records except in places where "Maybe Tomorrow" had been a hit, such as continental Europe and Japan.  Thus, The Iveys were relegated to the side at Apple, until Paul McCartney took an interest in the band's future.

Ironically, an Apple promotional EP for Walls Ice Cream that included a song by The Iveys ("Storm in a Teacup") was released in the UK on the same date that "Dear Angie" was released in continental Europe and Japan.

When Apple decided to include older songs on the "first" Badfinger release, the pseudo-soundtrack Magic Christian Music, both of The Iveys' singles were included.  Thus, this is the only Ron Griffiths composition included on a Badfinger album, since Ron quit the group just prior to the name change from The Iveys to Badfinger.

Personnel
Ron Griffiths - lead vocals, bass guitar
Tom Evans - backing vocals, rhythm guitar
Pete Ham - backing vocals, lead guitar
Mike Gibbins - drums

References

1969 singles
Apple Records singles
Badfinger songs
Song recordings produced by Tony Visconti
1969 songs